Sead Ramović (born 14 March 1979) is a German football manager and former player who played as a goalkeeper.  who is the manager of Premier Soccer League team TS Galaxy.

Club career
Born in Stuttgart, West Germany, Ramović started his career with FC Feuerbach. Since then, he has played for SpVgg Feuerbach, Stuttgarter Kickers, VfL Wolfsburg, Borussia Mönchengladbach, and Kickers Offenbach, all of which are German clubs. In July 2006, he signed with Tippeligaen club Tromsø IL. In 2010, he signed for Sivasspor. In 2011, he moved to FK Novi Pazar and played in the Serbian Superliga. On 17 November 2011, it was announced that he is to join Lillestrøm SK for the 2012 season.

Following limited use with Vendsyssel in the 2013 season, Ramović joined Strømsgodset before the 2014 season, but retired from the team early in the season, on 21 May.

International career
Ramović received his first call up for the Bosnia and Herzegovina national football team in 2004. Although he was included in the squad on several occasions, he never earned a cap.

References

External links
 

1979 births
Living people
Footballers from Stuttgart
German people of Bosnia and Herzegovina descent
Association football goalkeepers
Bosnia and Herzegovina footballers
Stuttgarter Kickers players
VfL Wolfsburg players
Borussia Mönchengladbach players
Kickers Offenbach players
Tromsø IL players
Sivasspor footballers
FC Metalurh Zaporizhzhia players
FK Novi Pazar players
Lillestrøm SK players
Vendsyssel FF players
Strømsgodset Toppfotball players
Bundesliga players
2. Bundesliga players
Eliteserien players
Süper Lig players
Ukrainian Premier League players
Serbian SuperLiga players
Danish 1st Division players
Bosnia and Herzegovina football managers
Bosnia and Herzegovina expatriate footballers
Bosnia and Herzegovina expatriate sportspeople in Germany
Expatriate footballers in Germany
Bosnia and Herzegovina expatriate sportspeople in Norway
Expatriate footballers in Norway
Bosnia and Herzegovina expatriate sportspeople in Turkey
Expatriate footballers in Turkey
Bosnia and Herzegovina expatriate sportspeople in Ukraine
Expatriate footballers in Ukraine
Bosnia and Herzegovina expatriate sportspeople in Serbia
Expatriate footballers in Serbia
Bosnia and Herzegovina expatriate sportspeople in South Africa
Expatriate soccer managers in South Africa
Bosnia and Herzegovina expatriate sportspeople in Denmark
Expatriate men's footballers in Denmark